Peter Whyke (born 7 September 1939) is an English former professional footballer who played as a right winger.

Career
Born in Barnsley, Whyke played for Smithies United, Barnsley, Rochdale and Scarborough. He played for Rochdale in the 1962 Football League Cup Final.

References

1934 births
Living people
English footballers
Barnsley F.C. players
Rochdale A.F.C. players
Scarborough F.C. players
English Football League players
Association football wingers